Dyschirius freyi is a species of ground beetle in a subfamily Scaritinae. It was described by Jedlicka in 1958.

References

freyi
Beetles described in 1958